Washington-Wheatley is a historic neighborhood in Kansas City, Missouri, United States. The neighborhood is located between 18th Street and 27th Street and Prospect Avenue to I-70. 

It is mostly an African-American neighborhood on the East Side.

Neighborhoods in Kansas City, Missouri
Kansas City metropolitan area
History of Kansas City, Missouri